Dobri Isak (Serbian Cyrillic: Добри Исак; trans. Kind Isaac) was a Yugoslav post-punk/darkwave band formed in Niš in 1983.

Dobri Isak existed for only several years, releasing only one studio album, Mi plačemo iza tamnih naočara (1984), before disbanding in 1986. During the following decades the band's only album enjoyed a cult status, and after it was reissued in 2009, it gained new attention from the audience and recognition from music critics in Serbia and other former Yugoslav republics.

History

1983 - 1986
In late 1983 Predrag Cvetičanin (guitar, vocals), with Zoran Đorđević (guitar), Branko (bass guitar) and Boban (drums), formed the band Dobri Isak. Having performed at minor local clubs, the band recorded a home made demo, however, the lineup dissolved during the summer of the following year. After several months, Cvetičanin, with bass guitarist Miloš Miladinović and drummer Saša Marković "Markiz", reformed the band. Soon after Nenad Cvetičanin, Predrag's brother, also became a member of the band. He joined the band while his own, Arnold Layne, was on hiatus.

The band recorded their first and only studio album Mi plačemo iza tamnih naočara (We Cry Behind Dark Glasses), released in 1984 by the Niš Students' Cultural Center (SKC), being the first release of the Center's Studentkult production, which issued an array of musical and literary releases. The album, released on compact cassette only and printed in a limited number of 100 copies, had been distributed by the Ljubljana Students' Cultural Center, and rapidly sold out.

The band presented their new material to the Niš audience, also performing at the 1985 Serbian Youth Festival in Knjaževac, winning the Best Performance Award, and gaining the opportunity to appear at the Dani Novih Omladinskih Novina (Days of New Youth Magazine) in Split during the summer of the same year. After the Split performance, the band performed with several other Niš bands at the Pozdrav iz Niša (Greetings from Niš) manifestation in Skopje. In a short period of time, the band had another performance in Skopje, appearing as guests at the first solo concert of the band Padot na Vizantija.

During the late 1985, the band performed at the Rock Bands Festival held at the Belgrade Youth Center, and in early 1986 the band had two appearances at the Zagreb alternative rock festival Yu Rock Moment, on March in the semi-final, and on May at the festival finale, held at the Republic Square, performing with Let 3, Oktobar 1864, and Mizar. During 1986 Predrag Cvetičanin produced the recordings for the Niš synthpop band Romantične Boje (Romantic Collors), singing part of the lead vocals on the track "San" ("A Dream"), but the recordings were never released due to the unsuccessful negotiations with PGP-RTB.

Dobri Isak performed until June 1986, when they held their last concert, performing with Arnold Layne and Mizar at Niš Synagogue, after which they decided to split up.

Post-breakup
During the 1990s and the 2000s Dobri Isak's only album ejoyed a cult status. In December 2009 the indie record label PMK Records re-released Mi plačemo iza tamnih naočara with seven additional bonus tracks consisting of unreleased material. The album reissue brought the new attention of the audience and recognition from music critics in Serbia and other former Yugoslav republics.

In June 2010 PMK Records released the 150 copies limited edition reissue of the album, featuring an alternate album cover, with the band logo written in red, and a black CD. In 2015 the album was released on vinyl record for the first time by the same record label. During the same year, the label issued the 100 copies limited vinyl edition of the album on transparent red vinyl.

Legacy 
In 2016 PMK Records released the tribute album I mi plačemo iza tamnih naočara (We Too Cry Behind Dark Glasses), featuring 11 covers of Dobri Isak songs by the bands Asphalt Chant, Iv/an, Figurative Theatre, Cyborgs on Crack, Pod, Novembar, Language.Sex.Violence, Paydo Komma, Baden-Baden, Katabazija, Plazma Maschina, Šlagvort Na Kraju, Psihokratija, Plastic Sunday, Horkestar and t.O.F. Croatian rock band Mlijeko covered "Mi plačemo iza tamnih naočara" in 2010.

The 2012 documentary about Niš rock scene directed by Marijan Cvetanović and Velimir Stojanović was entitled Mi plačemo iza tamnih naočara.

Discography

Studio albums
 Mi plačemo iza tamnih naočara (1984)

References

External links 
 Dobri Isak at Discogs
 Dobri Isak at Last.fm
 Dobri Isak at Rateyourmusic

Serbian post-punk music groups
Serbian dark wave musical groups
Serbian gothic rock groups
Yugoslav rock music groups
Yugoslav gothic rock groups
Musical groups from Niš
Musical groups established in 1983
Musical groups disestablished in 1986